Marino Ortolani (26 July 1904 in Altedo, Malalbergo, Province of Bologna, Italy; † 1983) was an Italian pediatrician who developed a clinical test for the recognition of hip dysplasia called the Ortolani test.

References

Italo Farnetani, Francesca Farnetani, La top twelve della ricerca italiana, « Minerva Pediatrica» 2015; 67 (5): pp.437-450
Italo Farnetani, Qualche notazione di storia della pediatria, in margine alla V edizione di Pediatria Essenziale, Postfazione. In Burgio G.R.( (a cura di). Pediatria Essenziale. 5a Ed.  Milano: Edi-Ermes; 2012. . vol. 2°, pp. 1757-1764.

External links
 Who's Who in Orthopedics: Marino Ortolani - Seyed Behrooz Mostofi
Italo Farnetani, Ortolani, Marino, Dizionario Biografico degli Italiani Istituto della Enciclopedia Italiana fondata da Giovanni Treccani. Roma: Istituto della Enciclopedia Italiana; 2013. Vol. 79, pp. 217-219.http://www.treccani.it/enciclopedia/marino-ortolani_(Dizionario-Biografico)/

1904 births
1983 deaths
Italian pediatricians
20th-century Italian physicians